USA-150, also known as GPS IIR-4 and GPS SVN-51, is an American navigation satellite which forms part of the Global Positioning System. It was the fourth Block IIR GPS satellite to be launched, out of thirteen in the original configuration, and twenty one overall. It was built by Lockheed Martin, using the AS-4000 satellite bus.

Launch 
USA-150 was launched at 01:48:00 UTC on 11 May 2000, atop a Delta II carrier rocket, flight number D278, flying in the 7925-9.5 configuration. The launch took place from Space Launch Complex 17A at the Cape Canaveral Air Force Station, and placed USA-150 into a transfer orbit. The satellite raised itself into medium Earth orbit using a Star-37FM apogee motor.

Mission 
It is used to broadcast the PRN 20 signal, and operates in slot 1 of plane E of the GPS constellation, having replaced USA-35, the first operational GPS satellite. As of 2012 it remains in service.

References 

Spacecraft launched in 2000
GPS satellites
USA satellites